Tylotiella idae is a species of sea snail, a marine gastropoda mollusk in the family Drilliidae.

Original description
     Poppe G.T., Tagaro S.P. & Goto Y. (2018). New marine species from the Central Philippines. Visaya. 5(1): 91-135. page(s): 107, pl. 10 figs 3-4.

References

External links
 Worms Link

idae